Mankar College, established in 1987, is a general degree college in Mankar, Purba Bardhaman district, West Bengal. It offers undergraduate courses in arts, commerce and science, and graduate course in Bengali. There are five languages taught: English, Bengali, Sanskrit, Hindi & Santali. Besides it offers general and honours courses in political science, history, geography, and philosophy. It offers accountancy honours, computer science and mathematics honours.  It is affiliated to the University of Burdwan.

Departments

Science

Physics
Mathematics 
Chemistry
Computer Science
Nutrition

Arts and Commerce

Bengali (UG & PG)
Economics
English
Geography
Hindi
History
Philosophy
Physical Education
Political Science
Sanskrit
Santali
Commerce

Accreditation
Recently (2016), Mankar College has been accredited and awarded B+ grade by the National Assessment and Accreditation Council (NAAC). The college is also recognized by the University Grants Commission (UGC).

See also

References

External links
Mankar College
University Grants Commission
National Assessment and Accreditation Council

Universities and colleges in Purba Bardhaman district
Educational institutions established in 1987
1987 establishments in West Bengal